Six (stylized as SIX) is an American military drama television series. The series was ordered by the History channel with an eight-episode initial order. The first two episodes were directed by Lesli Linka Glatter. Six premiered on January 18, 2017.

Six was renewed for a second season of 10 episodes and aired in 2018. In June, History announced the series' cancellation.

Premise
The series chronicles the operations and daily lives of operators who are part of the U.S. Naval Special Warfare Development Group (DEVGRU), more commonly known as SEAL Team Six, which is one of the U.S. Armed Forces' primary counter-terrorism units.

Cast

Main

 Barry Sloane as Senior Chief Special Warfare Operator (E-8) Joe "Bear" Graves a.k.a. Foxtrot Delta 1/FD1
 Kyle Schmid as Chief Special Warfare Operator (E-7) Alex Caulder a.k.a. Foxtrot Delta 2/FD2
 Juan Pablo Raba as Senior Chief Special Warfare Operator (E-8) Ricky "Buddha" Ortiz a.k.a. Foxtrot Delta 3/FD3
 Jaylen Moore as Chief Special Warfare Operator (E-7) Armin "Fishbait" Khan a.k.a. Foxtrot Delta 5/FD5
Edwin Hodge as Special Warfare Operator First Class (E-6) Robert Chase a.k.a. Foxtrot Delta 6/FD6
 Brianne Davis as Lena Graves
 Nadine Velazquez as Jackie Ortiz
 Dominic Adams as Michael Nasry
 Walton Goggins as Former Senior Chief Special Warfare Operator (E-8) Richard "Rip" Taggart
 Eric Ladin as Special Warfare Operator First Class (E-6) Trevor Wozniak  a.k.a. Foxtrot Delta 4/FD4 (season 2)
 Nikolai Nikolaeff as Tamerlin Shishoni, a Chechen/Jihadi mastermind (season 2)
 Olivia Munn as Gina Cline, a high-level CIA Operations Officer (season 2)

Recurring
Nondumiso Tembe as Na'omi Ajimuda
Lindsley Register as Dharma Caulder
Tyla Harris as Esther
Jarreth J. Merz as Emir Hatim Al-Muttaqi 
Robert Crayton as Buhari Guard 
Donny Boaz as Special Warfare Operator First Class (E-6) Beauregard "Buck" Buckley a.k.a. Foxtrot Delta 5/FD5 (season 1)
Rus Blackwell as Commander (O-5) Atkins, the former commanding officer of White Squadron.
Zeeko Zaki as Akmal Barayev (season 1)
Joshua Gage as Ricky Ortiz, Jr.
Jessica Garza as Anabel Ortiz
Britt Rentschler as Tammi Buckley
Angela Relucio as Lieutenant Junior Grade (O-2) Camille Fung
Katherine Evans as Marissa (season 2)
Erik Palladino as Commander Scott Hughes, the new commanding officer of White Squadron. (season 2)

Episodes

Season 1 (2017)

Season 2 (2018)
The History Channel aired an hour-long special entitled "Mission Debrief" on May 23, 2018, as a recap of season 1.

Production
Joe Manganiello was originally cast as Rip Taggart but left the series in April 2016 "due to a 'manageable' preexisting health issue". About a week after Manganiello's departure, Walton Goggins was cast as his replacement. All of the already done shoots with Manganiello's character, nearly two full episodes, had to be re-shot. Also Christopher Backus had been cast, but left the project to be on the series Roadies before the series started shooting.

Season two, which consists of 10 episodes, was produced by a new production company, Six 2 North Productions Inc. Kimberly Peirce and Colin Bucksey are directors, with George Perkins the executive producer. Season two began filming on July 17, 2017, in Metro Vancouver, around Pemberton, and throughout British Columbia, and completed filming on November 23, 2017.

Reception
Six has earned positive reviews from critics. On the review aggregator website Rotten Tomatoes, the series has an approval rating of 62% based on 13 reviews, with an average rating of 6.1/10. The website's critical consensus reads, "Six's well-crafted action and engaging characters are intriguing in spite of the show's trite premise and familiar narrative." Metacritic, which uses a weighted average, assigned a score of 54 out of 100 based on 14 critics, indicating "mixed or average reviews".

See also

 The Brave (TV series)
 SEAL Team (TV series)

References

External links
 Official Website
 
 

2010s American drama television series
2017 American television series debuts
2018 American television series endings
American action television series
American military television series
English-language television shows
History (American TV channel) original programming
Serial drama television series
Television shows filmed in North Carolina
Television shows filmed in Wilmington, North Carolina
Works about SEAL Team Six